Elections were held in the Australian state of Victoria on Saturday 12 June 1943 to elect 17 of the 34 members of the state's Legislative Council for six year terms. MLC were elected using preferential voting. The election was held concurrently with the Legislative Assembly election.

Results

Legislative Council

|}

Retiring Members

United Australia
Sir Herbert Olney MLC (Melbourne North)

Candidates
Sitting members are shown in bold text. Successful candidates are highlighted in the relevant colour. Where there is possible confusion, an asterisk (*) is also used.

See also
1943 Victorian state election

References

1943 elections in Australia
Elections in Victoria (Australia)
1940s in Victoria (Australia)
June 1943 events